Frank McKenzie (July 21, 1930 – May 31, 2001) was an American professional wrestler who appeared in American Wrestling Association, IWA Australia, National Wrestling Federation and Maple Leaf Wrestling. He appeared in many territories during his career.

Professional wrestling career

Early career
McKenzie stood at 6"10 and weighted at 280 pounds. Made his pro wrestling debut in 1950 in Texas. In 1954 he went to Canada to wrestle for Stu Hart's Stampede Wrestling in Calgary. He teamed up with Ilio DiPaolo and they won the NWA Calgary Tag Team titles by defeating Al and Tiny Mills.

American Wrestling Association (1958, 1961-1965, 1970)
In 1958 he debuted for American Wrestling Association in Minnesota where he wrestled there for many years. In 1961 he feuded with Bob Geigel and Bill Miller.

On October 10, 1970 McKenzie defeated Tarzan Tyler for the AWA Midwest Heavyweight Championship in Omaha, Nebraska. 

He dropped the title a month later to Ole Anderson. After the loss, he left the company.

WCW Australia (1964-1969)
In 1964 he went to Australia to wrestle for IWA Australia. He would feud with Killer Kowalski. On June 6, 1967 he defeated Kowalski for the IWA World Heavyweight Championship. He dropped the title to Skull Murphy in August. A year later he regained the title defeating Toru Tanaka on November 13, 1968. Once again he dropped the title to Skull Murphy. In 1969 he left Australia.

Various promotions
From 1965 to 1967 he wrestled for Mid-Atlantic Championship Wrestling. Also wrestled in Hawaii, Portland, Detroit, and Vancouver. Then he went to Toronto to wrestle for Maple Leaf Wrestling from 1970 to 1975. He teamed with various partners against the Love Brothers and Fabulous Kangaroos, Al Costello and Don Kent. He fought The Sheik for the U.S. title. In 1974 he feuded against Dusty Rhodes in Championship Wrestling from Florida. In 1975, he did commentary for the International Wrestling Association.

Death
McKenzie retired from wrestling in 1979. He was inducted into the Stampede (Calgary) Wrestling Hall of Fame and Northwest Wrestling Hall of Fame. He died on May 31, 2001 at 70 from abdominal aortic aneurysm. Away from wrestling he enjoyed sailing and photography. Some of his nature photos were printed in National Geographic.

Championships and accomplishments
 Stampede Wrestling
 Stampede Wrestling Hall of Fame (Class of 1995)
NWA Canadian Tag Team Championship (Calgary version) (1 time) - with Ilio DiPaolo
World Championship Wrestling (Australia)
IWA World Heavyweight Championship (Australia) (2 times)
IWA World Tag Team Championship (2 times) – with Billy White Wolf
Maple Leaf Wrestling
NWA Canadian Open Tag Team Championship (1 times) with Whipper Billy Watson
American Wrestling Association
AWA Midwest Heavyweight Championship (1 times)
NWA Big Time Wrestling
NWA Texas Tag Team Championship (1 time) - with and Red Bastien
National Wrestling Alliance
NWA Northwest Tag Team Championship (1 time) – with Ken Kenneth

References

External links
Tex McKenzie at Cagematch.net
Tex McKenzie at OnlineWorldOfWrestling.com
Tex McKenzie at Wrestlingdata.com

1930 births
2001 deaths
20th-century professional wrestlers
American male professional wrestlers
People from Edmonds, Washington
Professional wrestlers from Washington (state)
NWA Canadian Open Tag Team Champions
IWA World Heavyweight Champions (Australia)